Lilian Cheptoo Tomitom is a Kenyan Jubilee Party politician who is currently a member of the National Assembly as county woman representative for West Pokot County.

She attended Kacheliba Mixed Secondary School and Moi University before working as a university administrator. She was elected to the national assembly in 2017.

Election results

References

Kenyan politicians
Year of birth missing (living people)
Living people
Moi University alumni